Mount Sanderson is a mountain rising to about 2,300 m in south Rouen Mountains, situated in the northern portion of Alexander Island, Antarctica. It is situated 22.5 km east of Breze Peak in Havre Mountains. The mountain was first surveyed by the British Antarctic Survey in 1975–76. Named by United Kingdom Antarctic Place-Names Committee in 1980 after Timothy John Oliver Sanderson, glaciologist who was a member of the British Antarctic Survey during 1975–78, he worked on the George VI Ice Shelf.

See also

 Mount Nicholas
 Mount Spivey
 Mount Tchaikovsky

Mountains of Alexander Island